The GER Class B74 was a class of five 0-4-0T steam locomotives designed by Alfred John Hill for the Great Eastern Railway. They all passed to the London and North Eastern Railway at the 1923 grouping and received the LNER classification Y4.

History
These locomotives had  outside cylinders driving  wheels. They were built to replace the older, less powerful Class 209 (LNER Class Y5). From 1914 two of the class worked the Globe Road & Devonshire Street goods yards.

All were still in service at the 1923 grouping; the LNER adding 7000 to the numbers of nearly all the ex-Great Eastern locomotives, including the Class B74 locomotives. There were renumbered 8125–8129 in the 1944 renumbering scheme. At nationalisation in 1948, British Railways added 60000 to their numbers. 

In 1952, number 68129 was transferred to the Service (departmental) list and renumbered 33. Withdrawals started in 1955 with 68125, with 68127 and 68128 going in 1956 and 68126 in 1957. The last to be withdrawn was 33, in 1963.

References

Notes

Bibliography

External links

A. J. Hill locomotives — Great Eastern Railway Society
The Hill Y4 (GER B74) 0-4-0 Shunters — LNER Encyclopedia

B74
0-4-0T locomotives
Railway locomotives introduced in 1913
Scrapped locomotives
Standard gauge steam locomotives of Great Britain
Shunting locomotives